Cathy L. Rogers is a Canadian politician, who was elected to the Legislative Assembly of New Brunswick in the 2014 provincial election. She represented the electoral district of Moncton South as a member of the Liberal Party. She was New Brunswick's Finance Minister. Rogers stood down at the 2020 general election.

Electoral results

2018 election

2014 Election

References

Living people
New Brunswick Liberal Association MLAs
Women MLAs in New Brunswick
People from Moncton
21st-century Canadian politicians
21st-century Canadian women politicians
Women government ministers of Canada
Members of the Executive Council of New Brunswick
Finance ministers of New Brunswick
Year of birth missing (living people)
Female finance ministers